Talat Shahnaz Rahman is a Pakistani condensed matter physicist whose research topics include surface phenomena and excited media, including catalysis, vibrational dynamics, and magnetic excitations. She has also helped develop molecules that can "walk" across a solid surface by moving one part of the molecule while keeping another part attached to the surface. She is UCF Pegasus Professor of Physics at the University of Central Florida.

Education and career
Rahman earned a bachelor's degree in physics from the University of Karachi in 1969, a master's degree from the University of Islamabad in 1970, and a Ph.D. from the University of Rochester in 1977. After postdoctoral research at the University of California, Irvine, she became an assistant professor at Kansas State University in 1984, and by 2001 she was University Distinguished Professor at Kansas State. She moved to the University of Central Florida in 2006 as Distinguished Professor and chair of the physics department; she became Pegasus Professor in 2012 and stepped down as chair in 2015.

Recognition
Rahman became a Fellow of the American Physical Society in 1998, and a Fellow of the American Vacuum Society in 2016 for her "theoretical and computational contributions to understanding governing properties (chemical, optical, magnetic, vibrational) of nanoscale materials, to foster rational design of functional materials for various applications, in a bottomup approach". She won the Humboldt Prize in 2000.

References

External links
Home page

Year of birth missing (living people)
Living people
Pakistani physicists
Pakistani women physicists
American physicists
American women physicists
University of Karachi alumni
Quaid-i-Azam University alumni
University of Rochester alumni
Kansas State University faculty
University of Central Florida faculty
Fellows of the American Physical Society
Humboldt Research Award recipients